Al-Mulathameen Brigade (Brigade of the Masked Ones) was a terrorist militant organisation active in North and West Africa founded and led by Mokhtar Belmokhtar who was previously a member of Al-Qaeda in the Islamic Maghreb. In 2013 Al-Mulathameen merged with Movement for Oneness and Jihad in West Africa to form Al-Mourabitoun. In 2017 Al-Mourabitoun merged with the Saharan branch of Al-Qaeda in the Islamic Maghreb, Ansar Dine, and Macina Liberation Front to form Jama'at Nasr al-Islam wal Muslimin.

References

Al-Qaeda in the Islamic Maghreb
Groups affiliated with al-Qaeda
Azawad
Islamism in Africa
Islamist groups
Paramilitary organisations based in Mali
2013 establishments
Organizations designated as terrorist by the United States
Organizations designated as terrorist by Bahrain
Organizations designated as terrorist by Iraq
Political movements in Algeria
Rebel groups in Mali
Rebel groups in Algeria
Rebel groups in Niger
Organizations based in Africa designated as terrorist
Jihadist groups